Grupo Godó de Comunicación, S. A., doing business as Grupo Godó, is a Spanish media conglomerate based in Barcelona. Its assets include the daily newspapers La Vanguardia and Mundo Deportivo and the Catalan radio station RAC1.

History 
The origins of the group are linked to the Godó family, owners of La Vanguardia since 1887, when textile businessman  bought the newspaper, which had been founded in 1881. During the Francoist dictatorship the newspaper was renamed to La Vanguardia Española. Following the death of Franco, La Vanguardia Española embraced a profile both in favour of Catalan autonomism and in defence of the monarchy of Juan Carlos I and returned to its original name.

The Godó family was the primary shareholder behind Antena 3 Radio, launched in 1982, but the radio station was soon absorbed by PRISA. The Godó family was also among the founders of the television channel Antena 3, but their shares in the latter were sold to the Grupo Zeta.

In 2019, Godó sold its participation in the audiovisual production company Veranda (a joint venture with Boomerang TV) to Lagardère Studios. In 2021, the group sold the Catalan TV station 8TV to  GANSO 2022.

Holdings 

Newspapers
 La Vanguardia
 Mundo Deportivo
Radio
 RAC1

See also 
 Mass media in Spain

References 

Publishing companies of Spain
Companies based in Barcelona
Mass media in Barcelona
Conglomerate companies of Spain
Mass media companies of Spain
1956 establishments in Spain